= Segnochrobactrum =

Scientific classification
- Domain: Bacteria
- Kingdom: Pseudomonadati
- Phylum: Pseudomonadota
- Class: Alphaproteobacteria
- Order: Hyphomicrobiales
- Family: Segnochrobactraceae
- Genus: Segnochrobactrum; Akter et al. 2020
- Species: S. spirostomi

Binomial name
- Segnochrobactrum spirostomi Akter et al. 2020

Family of bacteria

Segnochrobactrum spirostomi is a species of Alphaproteobacteria. It is the only species in the genus Segnochrobactrum.
